Henry Bartos (May 20, 1913 – December 28, 1987) was an American football guard in the National Football League for the Washington Redskins.  He played college football at the University of North Carolina and was drafted in the twelfth round of the 1938 NFL Draft.  Henry “Hank” Bartos coached the line at the University of South Carolina under three different head coaches from 1946-1964.

1913 births
1987 deaths
American football offensive guards
North Carolina Tar Heels football players
Sportspeople from Brooklyn
Players of American football from New York City
Washington Redskins players